Miranda Martino (born 29 October 1933) is an Italian singer and actress.

Life and career 
Born in Moggio Udinese from Neapolitan parents, Martino started her career as singer in 1956.  In 1957, she debuted at the Festival di Napoli and in 1959 she made her first appearance at the Sanremo Music Festival, with the song "La vita mi ha dato solo te". In the same year she obtained her first commercial success with the song "Stasera tornerò", which ranked 11 in the Italian Hit Parade. Then she entered the two following editions of the Festival di Sanremo and in 1961 three of her songs entered the Top Ten ("Erano nuvole", "Frenesia" and "Serenatella c'o sì e c'o no"). In 1963 she obtained a critical and commercial success with the album Napoli, in which she covered twelve canzoni napoletane re-arranged by Ennio Morricone. In 1965, she made her theatrical debut and from then she focused her career on stage acting and, less prolifically, on films.

Discography 
Albums
 
     1958: Magic Moments At La Capannina di Franceschi  
     1959: 20 canzoni di Sanremo '59 (with Nilla Pizzi and Teddy Reno) 
     1959: Miranda Martino 
     1959: Napoli '59. Le 20 canzoni del festival (with Nilla Pizzi, Elio Mauro, Stella Dizzy and Teddy Reno) 
     1959: Il mio vero amore (EP)  
     1962: Miranda Martino 
     1963: Napoli 
     1964: Le canzoni di sempre  
     1966: Napoli volume II°  
     1967: Operetta primo amore 
     1970: Donna...Amore...Dolore  
     1971: Passione...   
     1977: Ottimo Stato    
     1977: La Valzerite  
     2000: Napoli mia bella Napoli

Filmography 
 La duchessa di Santa Lucia  (Roberto Bianchi Montero, 1959)
 Avventura al motel  (Renato Polselli, 1963)
 Canzoni in... bikini (Giuseppe Vari, 1963)
 Sedotti e bidonati (Giorgio Bianchi, 1964)
 Last Plane to Baalbek (Marcello Giannini & Hugo Fregonese, 1965)
 Addio mamma (Irving Jacobs, 1967)
 Paolo Barca, Schoolteacher and Weekend Nudist  (Flavio Mogherini, 1975)
 Gegè Bellavita (Pasquale Festa Campanile, 1979)
 A Strange Passion (Jean-Pierre Dougnac, 1984)
 Red American (Alessandro D'Alatri, 1991)
 Dio c'è  (Alfredo Arciero, 1998)
 Teste di cocco (Ugo Fabrizio Giordani, 1999)

References

External links 

 
 Miranda Martino at Discogs

Living people
Italian stage actresses
1933 births
Italian women singers
People from the Province of Udine
Italian film actresses